The University of the Arctic (UArctic) is an international cooperative network based in the Circumpolar Arctic region, consisting of universities, colleges, and other organizations with an interest in promoting education and research in the Arctic region.

UArctic was launched on June 12, 2001, endorsed by the Arctic Council and in conjunction with the tenth anniversary of the Rovaniemi Process and the Arctic Environmental Protection Strategy.

Member institutions

There are more than 150 members in the University of the Arctic. There are 37 members from Canada, 13 from Denmark, 1 from the Faroe Islands, 17 from Finland, 3 from Greenland, 10 from Iceland, 16 from Norway, 55 from Russia, 7 from Sweden, 27 from the United States and 38 from non-Arctic countries (Austria (1), Belgium (1), Czech Republic (1), China (15), France (1), Germany (1), India (1), Ireland (1), Italy (1), Japan (1), Korea (2), Mongolia (1), the Netherlands (1) and the United Kingdom (10), plus the International Polar Foundation).

Most UArctic members are higher education institutions, but other members include circumpolar indigenous organizations and research institutions.

Organization, governance, and administration
The University of the Arctic is governed by a structure in which the member institutions are represented through various mechanisms. It has evolved steadily since the organization's founding in 2001, with the latest addition being the Rectors' Forum (2006).

Council and Toyon
The foundation of the structure is the annual UArctic Council, which consists of representatives from all member institutions. It holds powers roughly corresponding to the parliament of a parliamentary democracy. Between Council meetings, the executive committee, Toyon, deals with relevant issues. Toyon consists of the chair, the Vice-secretary and the Chairs of all standing committees. All these positions are elected by the council.

Board of Governors
The "government" of UArctic is the Board of Governors, which is also elected by the council. At the Board meetings, the President and leader of the International Secretariat also participate.  The Board works with the Council and Administration on relevant issues, and may delegate specific tasks.

President
The President of UArctic is the organization's chief executive officer and is responsible for overall administration and the development and delivery of its programs. S/he is accountable to the Board for the overall management of the university and elected by the council. The President participates ex officio in meetings of the council, Toyon and the Board, and may form committees or other subsidiary bodies to carry out the programs and activities of the university.

International Secretariat
The Secretariat has the primary responsibility for coordinating internal and external information, examples of which are the monthly UArctic newsletter, Shared Voices, the website and news services. The Secretariat provides support for the rest of the UArctic structure.

Rectors' Forum
The Rectors' Forum brings together university and college presidents, rectors, provosts, chancellors and vice-presidents around specific themes. The Forum is reserved for institutional leadership and is not intended as a representative forum for members—the Council of UArctic serves that function—but rather it allows member institutions' top leaders meet to debate the activity of the organization.

Funding
The member organizations contribute resources to the University of the Arctic. Some of the countries with participating organizations, including Canada, Finland and Norway, provide funds for the university and its different programs, though the Federal Government of Canada decided in 2011 to cut its funding by 75 percent.  A small membership fee is also collected from member organizations.

Programs

Bachelor of Circumpolar Studies
The Circumpolar Studies program allows students attending University of the Arctic member institutions to learn about the North, with courses held in the classroom, online, outdoors, and around the world.

The Circumpolar Studies program gives students the opportunity to learn about the lands, peoples, and issues of the circumpolar world and prepares them for advanced study or professional employment in fields such as sustainable resource management, self-government, Arctic engineering, and northern tourism. Special emphasis is given to matters concerning Indigenous people of the Circumpolar North.

The Circumpolar Studies program consists of two required components: The BCS Core and an Advanced Emphasis.

The BCS Core consists of one lower-level introductory course and six upper-level advanced courses in three interdisciplinary fields of study. Advanced Emphases are programs of study, roughly equivalent to a semester of schooling, that focus on the advanced research of an area, issue, or problem of particular relevance to the North and for its people.

north2north
The north2north student exchange program provides opportunities for students from UArctic member institutions to experience different northern regions firsthand, and to share experiences face-to-face by allowing students to study at other UArctic institutions.

As a north2north participant, students travel to another circumpolar institution for a period of 3–12 months. This time period is dependent on the needs of the student, as well as the structures of their home and host institutions. Students have the advantage of taking courses that may not be available at their home institution and the courses taken during the exchange year are credited towards their degree. Successful applicants will receive a mobility grant to facilitate their stay at the host institution.

Field School

The UArctic Field School incorporates a selection of short, thematically focused courses that provide training for young researchers at member institutions in relevant fields. The Field School provides specialized onsite study of northern issues, organized by northern institutions. The UArctic Field School catalog is an online database of field excursion courses in which students from UArctic member institutions can participate.

See also
 Arctic circle
 
 
 Circumpolar Arctic

References

External links 
Official University of the Arctic website
Uarctic.org: Governance Structure of UArctic

 
Arctic research
Society of the Arctic
International college and university associations and consortia
Educational organisations based in Finland
Rovaniemi
Educational institutions established in 2001
2001 establishments in Finland
Government of the Arctic